Vanessa Huxford (born 13 October 1970) is a former English female rugby union player. She represented  at the 2002 and 2006 Women's Rugby World Cup, winning 2 silver medals. She started her career in Alton RFC before moving to Wasps Ladies.

References

External links

1970 births
Living people
England women's international rugby union players
English female rugby union players
Female rugby union players